Wuxi Sports Center (Simplified Chinese: 无锡市体育中心) is a multi-use stadium in Wuxi, China.  It is currently used mostly for soccer matches. The stadium holds 30,000 people.

Footnotes

External links 

Football venues in China
Sports venues in Jiangsu